Shiyuan may refer to:

Shiyuan (始元, 86BC–80BC), an era name used by Emperor Zhao of Han

Places in China
Shiyuan Township, Henan (柿元乡), a township in Qi County, Kaifeng, Henan
Shiyuan Township, Gansu (石塬乡), a township in Jishishan Bonan, Dongxiang and Salar Autonomous County, Gansu
Shiyuan Township, Jiangxi (石芫乡), a township in Ganzhou, Jiangxi
Shiyuan Township, Sichuan (石元乡), a township in Jiangyou, Sichuan
Shiyuan Subdistrict, Beijing (石园街道), a subdistrict in Shunyi District, Beijing
Shiyuan Han Tombs (柿园汉墓), tombs from the Han dynasty in Yongcheng, Henan